Krasny Posyolok is a rural locality (a village) in Ulyakhinskoye Rural Settlement, Gus-Khrustalny District, Vladimir Oblast, Russia. The population was 193 as of 2010.

Geography 
Krasny Posyolok is located on the Ninor River, 35 km south of Gus-Khrustalny (the district's administrative centre) by road. Sivtsevo is the nearest rural locality.

References 

Rural localities in Gus-Khrustalny District